The following NASCAR national series were held in 2001:
2001 NASCAR Winston Cup Series - The top racing series in NASCAR
2001 NASCAR Busch Series - The second-highest racing series in NASCAR
2001 NASCAR Craftsman Truck Series - The third-highest racing series in NASCAR

The death of Dale Earnhardt at the 2001 Daytona 500

 
NASCAR seasons